Tereza Hrochová (born 24 February 1996) is a Czech long-distance runner. She competed in the women's half marathon at the 2020 World Athletics Half Marathon Championships held in Gdynia, Poland.

In 2019, she competed in the women's half marathon at the Summer Universiade held in Naples, Italy. She finished in 13th place.

Hrochová competed in the women's marathon at the 2022 World Athletics Championships held in Eugene, Oregon, United States. She finished in 17th place.

References

External links 
 

Living people
1996 births
Czech female long-distance runners
Competitors at the 2019 Summer Universiade
Athletes (track and field) at the 2020 Summer Olympics
Olympic athletes of the Czech Republic
Czech female marathon runners
People from Česká Lípa
20th-century Czech women
21st-century Czech women